Villasor, Biddesorris or Bidda de Sorris in Sardinian language,  is a comune (municipality) in the Province of South Sardinia in the Italian region Sardinia, located about  northwest of Cagliari.

Villasor borders the following municipalities: Decimomannu, Decimoputzu, Monastir, Nuraminis, San Sperate, Serramanna, Vallermosa, Villacidro.

Demographic evolution

References

External links
 villasor.gov.it/

Cities and towns in Sardinia